The Ludix is a  scooter made by Peugeot Motocycles which comes in various models including "One", "Snake" and the "Blaster RS12". The scooter comes in both air-cooled and water-cooled forms. The 'One' model is a single seat vehicle whereas other variants allowed for the carrying of pillion passengers. The One was also a very basic model that used drum brakes front and rear as opposed to a hydraulic front disc on more expensive models. Similarly, the One was a kick start only model whereas others were available with electric start. Also the One model runs on a generator instead of a 12 volt battery like other models and many other Peugeot scooters, this causes the indicators to be very dim, the horn to be poor sounding and quiet and there to be no lights on the small dash other than a two-stroke warning light. The models were designed to target the budget end of the market and used a modular panel system that allowed for cheap customising options through the use of easily interchangeable panels. Ludix 50cc scooters are used to stunt often.

References

Motor scooters
Ludix
Mopeds